The Chapelloise or Belgijka is a traditional folk dance with change of partners (a so-called Mixer), belonging to the standard repertoire of a Bal Folk. Its most common name in France and the French-influenced European Bal Folk scene is Chapelloise, but the dance has many other names too (see below). In Poland, the dance is known under the name "belgijka" (which means "Belgian dance"), where it is very popular.

History of the dance 
The French name “La Chapelloise” is derived from a village in eastern France, Chapelle-des-Bois: Legend says that André Dufresne was teaching the dance there in the 1970s, and since participants did not remember its original name, the dance got famous by the name of the village where the workshop took place.

The dance was introduced in France in the 1930s by Alick-Maud Pledge. It is often claimed that the dance is of Swedish origin and that its original name is “Aleman's marsj” (Guilcher 1998, Oosterveen 2002, Largeaud 2011 and countless websites). However, the spelling “marsj” is not Swedish (it looks rather Norwegian) and the choreography bears no similarity with Swedish folk dances. Instead, this dance is known in Scandinavian dance collections (Swedish, Danish and Norwegian) as “All American Promenade”. This, together with its dissimilarity to Swedish folk dances and its similarity to other mixer dances in Britain and America, pinpoint rather to a non-Swedish origin of the dance.
The Norwegian dance collector Hulda Garborg (1862-1934) is reported to have learnt the dance in the USA and brought it to Norway, but its description in a Scandinavian language was published much later.
The association of the dance with Sweden stems perhaps from the fact that in Denmark, the All American Promenade is most often danced to a Swedish tune: Gärdeby Gånglåt, attributed to the Swedish fiddler  (1865-1952).

In Belgium, the dance is called “Jig”/“Gigue” after the music most commonly played to the dance or “Aapje” (an acronym for “All American Promenade”, AAP).

Sometimes it is claimed that the “All American Promenade” was choreographed in the 1960s by Jim Arkness; but a description of this dance was published already in 1953 and the dance is probably derived from the British "Gay Gordons":
The “Gay Gordons” dance was mentioned already in 1907, and was a popular 'old time' dance  in Britain in the 1940s and 1950s, along with "The Military Two Step" (by James Finnigan) and the "Dashing White Sergeant". The "Gay Gordons" was known to all Aberdeen folk dancers in 1950. Its first eight measures are identical to the Chapelloise/AAP, but the “Gay Gordons” lacks the change of partners which is typical for the Chapelloise/AAP.

In Poland, the dance is known under the name "belgijka" (which means "Belgian dance"), where it is very popular.

Sources

External links to dance descriptions 
in French: La Chapelloise
in American: All American Promenade
video of the Carolina Promenade, (Folk Process?)
video of Chapelloise at a Eurobal in the UK

European folk dances